Syzygium ingens, commonly known as red apple, is a species of flowering plant that is endemic to eastern Australia. It is a medium-sized to tall rainforest tree with narrow elliptic to oblong leaves and panicles of white flowers on the ends of branchlets, followed by spherical red berries.

Description 
It has a smooth, straight, greyish or fawn-coloured trunk that is buttressed at the base of older specimens. The upper surface of the leaves is glossy green and the lower surface is paler with a raised mid-rib. The flowers are borne in panicles on the ends of branchlets, the panicles shorter than the leaves.

Taxonomy
Red apple was first formally described in 1861 by Charles Moore in Catalogue of the Natural and Industrial Products of New South Wales, exhibited in the School of Arts by the International Exhibition Commissioners and was given the name Nelitris ingens from an unpublished description by Ferdinand von Mueller. In 1988, Gordon P. Guymer and Bernard Hyland changed the name to Acmena ingens in the journal Muelleria, a name that is accepted by the National Herbarium of New South Wales.

In 2006, Lyndley Craven and Edward Sturt Biffin changed Moore's name Nelitris ingens to Syzygium ingens in the journal Blumea, the name accepted by the Australian Plant Census

Distribution and habitat
Red apple grows on volcanic soil from near Gympie in south eastern Queensland to Casino in northern New South Wales.

Ecology
Birds seen eating the fruit of this species include wompoo fruit dove, green catbird, eastern rosella, pied currawong and topknot pigeon.

Use in horticulture
Germination is assisted by removing the seed from the flesh, and soaking for a day or two to kill any insect larvae. Germination is swift and reliable. Cuttings also strike well.

References

Myrtales of Australia
Trees of Australia
Flora of New South Wales
Flora of Queensland
Myrtaceae
Taxa named by Bernard Hyland